Jesenovik (Istro-Romanian: Sucodru; Italian: Iessenoviza) is a small village in Istria, Croatia, in the municipality of Kršan. In 2011, the population of the village is 57. The village is inhabited mostly by Istro-Romanians.

Description 
The village is located close to the local road Šušnjevica - Plomin and the railroad Šušnjevica - Labin, at the former Lake Čepić, now a field, on the Western slopes of Učka, below the Brgud peak, with an elevation of 80 metres.

Demography

References

Sources

External links
Istria on the Internet - Jesenovik

Populated places in Istria County
Istro-Romanian settlements